Gasherbrum IV, surveyed as K3, is the 17th highest mountain on Earth and the 6th highest in Pakistan. 

One of the peaks in the Gasherbrum massif, its immense West Face looms over the glacial junction of Concordia to the west. The Name "Gasherbrum" is often claimed to mean "Shining Wall", presumably a reference to this face's tendency to reflect the rays of the setting sun, but in fact it comes from "rgasha" (beautiful) and "brum" (mountain) in Balti, hence it actually means "beautiful mountain." 

Despite its lower height relative to the surrounding eight-thousand meter peaks, Gasherbrum IV is a venerated challenge among mountaineers.

Notable ascents and attempts

 1958 First ascent by Walter Bonatti and Carlo Mauri on an Italian expedition led by Riccardo Cassin via the Northeast Ridge and the North Summit. Traversing the pinnacled ridge to the main summit was considered the crux of the climb.
However, bad weather, depletion of food and fuel, and extreme exhaustion forced them to stop at the north summit. The editors of Climbing magazine considered it the greatest achievement of mountaineering in the twentieth century.
 1986 First ascent of the Northwest Ridge by Greg Child, Tim Macartney-Snape and Tom Hargis, involving an open bivouac on the north summit. This was the second ascent of Gasherbrum IV.
 1997 First complete ascent via the West Face by a Korean team, via the central spur. Bang Jung-ho, Kim Tong-kwan and Yoo Huk-jae reached the summit after a sieged ascent quoted as 5.10 A3.
 1999 Second ascent of the Northwest Ridge by Kang Yeon-ryong and Yun Chi-won, part of a 13-member Korean team.
 2008 Third ascent of the Northwest Ridge by a Spanish team composed of Alberto Iñurrategi, Juan Vallejo, José Carlos Tamayo, Mikel Zabalza, and Ferran Latorre. The team did not get to the main summit, but stopped at a minor peak a short distance from the true summit.

See also
 List of mountains in Pakistan
 List of highest mountains

References

Mountains of Gilgit-Baltistan
Seven-thousanders of the Karakoram